The 2014 Monte-Carlo Rolex Masters was a men's tennis tournament for male professional players, played from 12 April through 20 April 2014, on outdoor clay courts. It was the 108th edition of the annual Monte Carlo Masters tournament, which was sponsored by Rolex for the sixth time. It took place at the Monte Carlo Country Club in Roquebrune-Cap-Martin, France, near Monte Carlo, Monaco.

Points and prize money

Points distribution
Because the Monte Carlo Masters is the non-mandatory Masters 1000 event, special rules regarding points distribution are in place. The Monte Carlo Masters counts as one of a player's 500 level tournaments, while distributing Masters 1000 points.

Prize money
The total prize money pot for the 2014 competition is €3,452,415, distributed throughout both competitions.

Singles main draw entrants

Seeds

Rankings are as of April 7, 2014

Other entrants
The following players received wildcards into the main draw:
  Benjamin Balleret
  Simone Bolelli
  Roger Federer
  Dominic Thiem

The following players received entry via qualifying:
  Evgeny Donskoy
  Teymuraz Gabashvili
  David Goffin
  Michaël Llodra
  Paul-Henri Mathieu
  Albert Montañés
  Albert Ramos

The following players received entry as lucky losers:
  Pablo Carreño Busta
  Marinko Matosevic

Withdrawals
Before the tournament
  Richard Gasquet → replaced by  Pablo Carreño Busta
  Tommy Haas → replaced by  Igor Sijsling
  Florian Mayer → replaced by  Guillermo García López
  Fernando Verdasco → replaced by  Marinko Matosevic

During the tournament
  Nicolás Almagro

Doubles main draw entrants

Seeds

 Rankings are as of April 7, 2014

Other entrants
The following pairs received wildcards into the doubles main draw:
  Romain Arneodo /  Benjamin Balleret
  Jérémy Chardy /  Gilles Simon

The following pair received entry as alternates:
  Roberto Bautista-Agut /  Andreas Seppi

Withdrawal
Before the tournament
  Fernando Verdasco

Finals

Singles

  Stan Wawrinka defeated  Roger Federer, 4–6, 7–6(7–5), 6–2

Doubles

  Bob Bryan /  Mike Bryan defeated  Ivan Dodig /  Marcelo Melo, 6–3, 3–6, [10–8]

References

External links
 
 Association of Tennis Professionals (ATP) tournament profile